Hans Svaning (1503 – 20 September 1584) was a Danish historian.

Biography
Svaning was born at the village of Svaninge on  Funen.
He attended Vor Frue skole in Copenhagen and the University of Wittenberg graduating  in 1529 and in 1533 receiving his  master's degree.  
Between 1541–52, he was the tutor of Prince Frederick, later King Frederick II of Denmark  and became a royal  historiographer in 1553.
In 1539 he became professor of rhetoric at the University of Copenhagen. In 1547, he received  the deanery at Ribe.  His main work was a complete Danish history in Latin, Danmarkshistorie, which was completed in manuscript in 1579 and stored in the University of Copenhagen Library but  lost in the Copenhagen Fire of 1728. Svaning died in Ribe in 1584, aged 81 years.

References 

1503 births
1584 deaths
People from the Region of Southern Denmark
 University of Wittenberg  alumni
Academic staff of the University of Copenhagen
16th-century Danish historians
Historiographers